Raúl Alejandro Naiff (born March 23, 1973) is a naturalized Palestinian former footballer.

Club career
Naif has played club football in Argentina, Honduras, Chile and Colombia as well as playing for the Palestine national football team. He had three different spells with Honduran side C.D. Victoria for whom he netted 32 league goals in total.

References

External links
 
  
 

1973 births
Living people
Footballers from Córdoba, Argentina
Palestinian footballers
Palestine international footballers
Argentine footballers
Argentine people of Palestinian descent
Argentine expatriate footballers
Palestinian expatriate footballers
Association football forwards
Deportivo Español footballers
C.D. Victoria players
Audax Italiano footballers
Santiago Wanderers footballers
C.D. Marathón players
Provincial Osorno footballers
Puerto Montt footballers
Independiente Santa Fe footballers
Quesos Kümey footballers
Chilean Primera División players
Categoría Primera A players
Liga Nacional de Fútbol Profesional de Honduras players
Expatriate footballers in Chile
Expatriate footballers in Colombia
Expatriate footballers in Honduras
Argentine expatriate sportspeople in Chile
Argentine emigrants to Palestine
Argentine expatriate sportspeople in Colombia
Argentine expatriate sportspeople in Honduras